is a Japanese football club from Shinjo, Toyama, currently playing in the Hokushin'etsu League Division One. They competed in the Emperor's Cup five times.

Shinjo Club play their home games at Iwase Sports Park. It can hold 3,400 supporters, has 800 seats and floodlights.

Current squad

References

External links
  

Football clubs in Japan
Association football clubs established in 1968
Sports teams in Toyama Prefecture
1968 establishments in Japan